USS LST-950/LST(H)-950 was an  in the United States Navy. Like many of her class, she was not named and is properly referred to by her hull designation.

Construction
LST-950 was laid down on 1 September 1944, at Hingham, Massachusetts, by the Bethlehem-Hingham Shipyard; launched on 4 October 1944; sponsored by Mrs. C. C. Recca; and commissioned on 27 October 1944.

Service history
During World War II, LST-950 was assigned to the Asiatic-Pacific theater and participated in the assault and occupation of Okinawa Gunto from April through June 1945.

On 15 September 1945, she was redesignated LST(H)-950 and performed occupation duty in the Far East until early November 1945. The tank landing ship was decommissioned on 23 September 1946, and struck from the Navy list on 10 June 1947. On 8 March 1948, the ship was sold to the Ships Power & Equipment Corp., of Barber, New Jersey, for scrapping.

Awards
LST-950 earned one battle star for World War II service.

Notes

Citations

Bibliography 

Online resources

External links
 

 

LST-542-class tank landing ships
World War II amphibious warfare vessels of the United States
Ships built in Hingham, Massachusetts
1944 ships